The 2021 Milton Keynes Council election took place May 6 to elect members of Milton Keynes Council in England. This was on the same day as other local elections.

One third of the council was up for election, plus two by-elections following resignations in the Central Milton Keynes and Woughton and Fishermead wards.

Results summary

Seats up for election

Results

Ward results

Bletchley East

Bletchley Park

Bletchley West

Bradwell

Broughton

Campbell Park & Old Woughton

Central Milton Keynes

Danesborough & Walton

Loughton & Shenley

Monkston

Newport Pagnell North & Hanslope

Newport Pagnell South

Olney

Shenley Brook End

Stantonbury

Stony Stratford

Tattenhoe

Wolverton

Woughton & Fishermead

References

Milton Keynes
Milton Keynes Council elections
2020s in Buckinghamshire